John Molyneux (died 1588), of Thorpe, Nottinghamshire, was an English politician.

He was a Member (MP) of the Parliament of England for Nottinghamshire in 1563.

References

Year of birth missing
1588 deaths
People from Newark and Sherwood (district)
English MPs 1563–1567